= Lucélia Rodrigues da Silva case =

2008 case of violence in Goiás, Brazil

- Location: Setor Marista, Goiânia, Goiás, Brazil
- Date: June 1, 2008
- Attack type: torture
- Injuries: 1
- Victim: Lucélia Rodrigues da Silva
- Accused: Sílvia, Vanice Maria Novais, marido de Sílvia
- Judge: José Carlos Duarte

The Lucélia Rodrigues da Silva case refers to the torture case of the girl Lucélia Rodrigues da Silva, who was found by the police, chained and gagged, when she was 12 years old, in 2008. She was a victim of violence by her adoptive mother, businesswoman Sílvia Calabresi Lima, resident of Setor Marista , an upscale neighborhood in Goiânia.

In February 2020, when it aired an interview with Lucélia, Record TV Goiás classified the case as "one of the thirty most shocking cases of violence in Brazil". Terra portal classified it as "one of the thirty crimes that shook Brazil".

In June 2021, Lucélia told TV Anhanguera: “It is possible [to overcome]. I forgave, I chose to forgive. Forgiving is not forgetting. It is remembering and not feeling pain anymore”.

== Biography ==
Daughter of poor parents, Lucélia was taken by Sílvia to study, with her mother's permission. On Record TV, she said in 2020 that initially the adoptive mother had been affectionate with her. "She took me shopping for new clothes, enrolled me in boarding school. I was treated like a princess." She revealed that everything changed after about six months, when she was tortured. She was also obliged to perform domestic services considered inappropriate for her age.

After the discovery of the crime, Lucélia went to a shelter and was later adopted by a couple of shepherds. Currently, she is married and has two children. “My dream was to get married and have a family. I got married. I fulfilled my dream of becoming a mother. My family is my greatest asset, ”she said during interviews.

== The crimes ==
Among the tortures inflicted on Lucélia are: not eating for up to two days, having her tongue cut out with pliers, having her fingers and toes pressed against the door (she lost the tip of a finger), being beaten with a broom handle, having pepper placed in the mouth, nose and eyes, being forced to eat dog feces and a cockroach, among other things. "She hit me 70 times on the head, 60 on the back of the head, nine on the stomach. I remember, because I was forced to count them all. That day there was no way and she was forced to take me to the hospital", he told Record TV. Lucélia also revealed that she was forced to tell the doctor that she had fallen down the stairs.

"I got to stay in chains for 12 hours", said the victim as well, about another of the tortures he suffered. When asked why she hadn't asked for help, not even at the Colégio Militar where she studied, she said it was out of fear.

The crime was discovered when a neighbor, who Lucélia called Dr. Fabio noticed that she no longer went to school. He made a complaint and when the police from the Police Station for the Protection of Children and Adolescents (DPCA) went to the apartment, they found the girl bound and gagged.

== Prison and penalty ==
Sílvia was arrested in March 2008 and sentenced to 15 years in prison. She received the right to progress to a semi-open regime in 2014.

The criminal's employee, Vanice Maria Novais, was also sentenced, in June 2008, to seven years in prison for participating in the crime. Sílvia's husband, on the other hand, got 1 year and 8 months for omission, but had the sentence commuted to community service. Also in June 2008, the Court condemned the couple to pay compensation of R$380,000 for moral and aesthetic damages, in addition to labor costs to the victim.

“All these conducts are part of the same criminal intent, always aiming at the practice of torture which, from what can be inferred, has, over time, increased in intensity and quantity. The question of just whether the criminal type of torture requires the practice of violence or a serious threat becomes irrelevant, because, I understand, even on occasions in which the victim was deprived of food, or subjected to excessive or inadequate work, there was only the objective to deprive her of resistance to submit more easily to daily threats and violence”, said judge José Carlos Duarte, of the 7th Criminal Court of the Court of Justice of Goiás, at the time of the conviction.

Lucélia's biological mother, Joana d'Arc da Silva, who had gone to a popular jury under the accusation of having received money to deliver her daughter to Sílvia, was acquitted. Indicted for omission, Sílvia's son was also acquitted.
